African Lion Safari is a family-owned safari park in Southern Ontario, Canada, straddling the cities of Hamilton and Cambridge, located  west of Toronto. Accompanying the game reserves is a walking section where exotic birds and primates, as well as the park's herd of Asian elephants, are on display.

African Lion Safari is an accredited member of the CAZA, and is also a member of the World Association of Zoos and Aquariums (WAZA), the International Elephant Foundation (IEF) as well as the International Association of Avian Trainers and Educators (IAATE).

History
This safari park was founded by Gordon Debenham "Don" Dailley, a retired Canadian Army colonel, and opened its doors on August 21, 1969. Dailley initially partnered with the Chipperfield family from England to purchase four farms in the Rockton, Ontario area totaling . He bought out the Chipperfields in the early 1970s. It remains privately owned, and the only significant feature was the drive-through reserve. In 1971, the park began working with Asian elephants, and in 1985 they started to make a concentrated effort to breed Asian elephants. Over the years, successful breeding of 30 endangered species and 20 threatened species has occurred in the park.

Exhibits

Reserves

In the Nairobi Sanctuary, visitors can see Ankole-Watusi, Llama, European White Stork, Egyptian Goose, and Grey Crowned Crane. The reserve consists of a large grassy field.

Between the Nairobi Sanctuary and the Simba Lion Country is the Cheeta breeding Center, which is home to Cheetahs. This preserve features several enclosures where the cheetahs live either separately or grouped.

Simba Lion Country is home to African Lions. The reserve consists of, like the other reserves such as the Nairobi Sanctuary, a grassy field. This reserve is notable because it has a structure made out of rocks so the lions can rest.

Timbavati Lion Country is home to White Lions, also known as Timbavati lions. This reserve also has a rock structure for the lions to rest or play on.

Wankie Bushland Trail is home to Olive Baboons, Bongo, Zebu, and Malayan Tapirs. The baboons' tower is a house and a playground for them.

The Rocky Ridge Veldt includes Rothschild's Giraffe, Grant's Zebra, Wildebeest, Common Eland, Barbary Sheep, Ostrich, White Rhinoceros, Addax, and Scimitar Oryx. This reserve is grassy with shelters and shade structures and several piles of rocks for animals to climb on.

The Australasia reserve includes Himalayan Tahr, Yak, Nilgai, Indian Rhinoceros, Western Grey Kangaroo, Red Kangaroo, Red-Necked Wallaby, and Sicilian Donkey. In smaller fenced areas on the periphery of this reserve are enclosures for Turkmenian (Bukharan) Markhor, Sichuan Takin,  This reserve is a mix of trees, grass and pond.

The North America reserve is home to American Bison, Elk, Fallow Deer, and Markhor. This reserve is grassy.

Tours

The African Lion Safari offers two tours for no additional charge; the first one is by boat around a lake whose islands are inhabited by various primates, and the second by train through a natural wetland.

Visitors onboard the African Queen Boat Cruise will see Black-Handed Spider Monkey, White-Handed Gibbon, Siamang, Black-and-White Ruffed Lemur, Marabou Stork, Ring-Tailed Lemur, Black Spider Monkey, Pink-Backed Pelican, and Black Swan.

The Nature Boy Scenic Railway travels through natural forest where visitors see native wildlife and several exotic species such as Fallow Deer and Reindeer. Trains are pulled by a miniature replica of the Southern Pacific's C. P. Huntington, a 4-2-4T Steam Locomotive.

Breeding programs

The park is involved in the International Species Survival Plans for Asian elephants, cheetahs, White rhinos, and Cinereous vultures. It has provided captive bred Barn owls, Burrowing owls, Trumpeter swans, Ferruginous Hawks, and a Bald eagle to reintroduction programs for release into the wild.

The park currently claims to have the most successful Asian elephant breeding program in North America, and in 2008 became home to the first third generation Asian elephant in North America. It has received several CAZA awards, including those recognizing outstanding achievements in the care of both cheetahs and giraffes.

In 2010, "Jake" became African Lion Safari's first successful Asian elephant birth from an artificial insemination, and the first birth of this kind in Canada.

Controversies 
A demonstration was held at African Lion Safari on Saturday, May 4, 2013.  Animal rights activists from the Grassroots Ontario Animal Liberation Network staged a protest during the Safari's opening day to raise awareness about issues surrounding the use of exotic animals for entertainment and to expose the park as a for-profit business based on animal exploitation. Activists also claimed that the use of bull hooks during elephant shows at the park were cruel and archaic.

In March 2021, animal protection organization In Defense of Animals named African Lion Safari as the worst zoo for elephants in its annual report, citing cruel training methods, exposure to Hamilton's harsh winter climate, constant zoo transfers, and breeding processes. Concerns were also expressed towards a plan to sell two elephants to Fort Worth Zoo - which ranked second on the said report - for $2,000,000.

Incidents
In November 1989, Omar Norton, a 21-year-old part-time employee and biology student at McMaster University was crushed to death by a five-tonne bull elephant named Tusko while trying to break up a fight between it and another elephant.

In April 1996, a couple driving through the game reserve were mauled by a Bengal tiger (which the zoo no longer exhibits). They later launched a lawsuit against the park which took several years to resolve. Finally in January 2005, a court awarded them and their families $2.5 million.

In June 2019, a trainer was airlifted to hospital after being attacked by one of the safari's elephants.

Notes

External links

 

Safari parks
Amusement parks in Canada
Zoos in Ontario
Culture of Hamilton, Ontario
Tourist attractions in Hamilton, Ontario
Buildings and structures in Hamilton, Ontario
Zoos established in 1969
1969 establishments in Ontario